This is the list of scheduled destinations served by Bulgaria Air as of February 2023. Bulgaria Air currently flies to 29 major cities in Europe and the Middle East.

Destinations

References

Lists of airline destinations